The 1913 U.S. Open was the 19th U.S. Open, held September 18–20 at The Country Club in Brookline, Massachusetts, a suburb southwest of Boston. Amateur Francis Ouimet, age 20, won his only U.S. Open title in an 18-hole playoff, five strokes ahead of Britons Harry Vardon and Ted Ray.

The four rounds were played over two days, Thursday and Friday. After 36 holes, Vardon and Wilfrid Reid co-led at 147 (+1), and after the third round on Friday morning, Ouimet, Vardon, and Ray were tied for the lead at 225 (+6). All three shot 79 in the afternoon and remained tied for the lead at the end of regulation at 304 (+12).

In the Saturday playoff round, all were tied at even-par 38 at the turn, then Ouimet had a bogey-free back nine 34 for 72 (–1), Vardon was second with 77, and Ray came in third with a 78. It was widely hailed as a stunning upset over the strongly-favored Britons and increased the popularity of the game in the United States.

Ouimet's victory was the first of eight wins by amateurs at the U.S. Open; Bobby Jones won four and the last was Johnny Goodman in 1933, .

The U.S. Open returned to the course for the 50th and 75th anniversaries in 1963 and 1988, and the U.S. Amateur was held at The Country Club on the centennial anniversary in 2013; it also hosted the Ryder Cup in 1999. All four events, except the 2013 U.S. Amateur, were won by Americans. The 2022 U.S. open, played at The Country Club, was won by Englishman Matt Fitzpatrick. 

Vardon, the 1900 champion, won a sixth British Open in 1914. Ray, the British Open champion in 1912, won the U.S. Open in 1920.

The tournament inspired the Mark Frost book The Greatest Game Ever Played: Harry Vardon, Francis Ouimet, and the Birth of Modern Golf (2002). The book was adapted into the film The Greatest Game Ever Played (2005), directed by Bill Paxton.

Course

Past champions in the field 

Source:

Did not play: Laurie Auchterlonie (1902), Willie Smith (1899).

Round summaries

First round
Thursday, September 18, 1913 (morning)

Source:

Second round
Thursday, September 18, 1913 (afternoon)

Source:

Third round
Friday, September 19, 1913 (morning)

Source:

Final round
Friday, September 19, 1913 (afternoon)

Source:

Amateurs: Ouimet (+12), Fownes (+20), Herreshoff (+26), Travers (+30)

Scorecard

Cumulative tournament scores, relative to par

Source:

Playoff 
Saturday, September 20, 1913

Source:

Scorecard

Source:

References

External links
Results at USGA site
USOpen.com – 1913

U.S. Open (golf)
U.S. Open (golf)
U.S. Open golf
Golf in Massachusetts
Events in Norfolk County, Massachusetts
U.S. Open (golf)
Sports competitions in Massachusetts
Sports in Brookline, Massachusetts
Tourist attractions in Brookline, Massachusetts
U.S. Open (golf)